A salt cave is a cave formed within rock salt by dissolution of this very soluble rock by water. As with other soluble rocks, a distinctive set of landscape features can arise from the solutional process; in this case it is known as salt karst or 'halite karst'. The three key areas of salt karst are those in Iran, Israel and Spain, together with an example in Romania. Malcham cave in Israel is the longest salt cave in the world with a measured length of over 10km. It is located at Mount Sodom. There are significant salt caves on Qeshm Island in Iran including Tri Nahacu Cave and Namakdan Cave. This cave was listed in October 2022 by the International Union of Geological Sciences in their 'First 100 IUGS Geological Heritage Sites' as being of global significance for the understanding of tectonics and ongoing geological processes.  Amongst the caves developed within the several salt karsts in Spain are Cova dels Meandres de Sales which at 4.3km in length is the world's third longest. The fourth longest is Pestera 6S de la Manzalesti at 3.1km in length.

References

 
Landforms
Geomorphology